Jim Burns is an English poet, writer and magazine editor. He was born in Preston, Lancashire in 1936.

Burns was educated at grammar school, worked in mills, and joined the army in 1954. While stationed in Germany, Burns developed a love of jazz and of American writers, accessible through American Forces Network radio and through bookshops stocking new literature for American service personnel. After leaving the army in 1957, he returned to Preston and sought out new writers filtering through to Britain, travelling to Manchester and London to explore those experimental bookshops which stocked the more difficult-to-find ones.

Burns had his first poems published in New Voice magazine in 1962, and soon began writing for and about small poetry magazines in a range of publications including The Guardian, Tribune and Ambit. Several books of his poetry have been published, including two volumes of his selected works.

In 1964, Burns launched Move, a poetry magazine featuring British and North American writers (including Chris Torrance, Larry Eigner, Lee Harwood, Bill Deemer, Michael Horovitz, Earle Birney, Dave Cunliffe and Tina Morris) which ran for eight issues (it folded in 1968): it was part of the British poetry revival, lauded beyond the traditional audience of middle class intellectuals in London, Oxford and Cambridge. Burns contributed poetry to many other magazines, and literary reviews and articles to The Guardian, Tribune and New Society. Perhaps his most important contributions were bringing the world of small poetry magazines to a wider audience through regular reviews and columns, and in particular spreading his knowledge of those lesser known North American writers who he felt deserved greater attention.

When the editor of Palantir poetry magazine (published through Preston Polytechnic) stepped down, Burns took over from issue number 3 in May 1976; this gave him the opportunity to direct attention to writers he felt deserved more support. Working on Palantir through to the final (23rd) issue in 1983, he included work from many leading poets (for example, Gael Turnbull, Wes Magee and Edwin Brock), and wrote about the lesser known beat poets.

, Burns continues to write on jazz, literature and politics, and has published several essay collections including Beats, Bohemians & Intellectuals (Trent Books, 2000), Radicals, Beats & Beboppers (Penniless Press, 2011) and Artists, Beats & Cool Cats (Penniless Press, 2014).

Bibliography

Poetry

A Way of Looking at Things			Move Publications		1964

Two for Our Time					Screeches			    1964

Some Poems					        Crank Books (NY)		1965

Some More Poems					    R Books			        1966

The Summer Season				    Target Publications		1966

My Sad Story & Other Poems			New Voice			    1967

Cells: Prose Pieces					Grosseteste Press		1967

Saloon Bar: Three Jim Burns Stories		Ferry Press			1967	

The Store of Things					Phoenix Pamphlets		1969

Types: Prose Pieces and Poems		Second Aeon		        1970

A Single Flower					    Andium Press		    1972

Leben in Preston					Palmenpresse (GFR)	        1973

Easter in Stockport					Rivelin Press			1975

Fred Engels in Woolworths			Oasis Books			    1975

Playing it Cool					    Galloping Dog Press	    1976

The Goldfish Speaks from Beyond the Grave	Salamander		1976

Fred Engels bei Woolworth			Rotbuch Verlag (GFR)	1977

Catullus in Preston					Cameo Club Alley Press	1979

Aristotle’s Grill					Platform Poets		    1979

Notes from a Greasy Spoon			Uni College Cardiff		1980

Internal Memorandum				    Rivelin Press			1982

Notizen Von Einem Schmierigen Loffel	Palmenpresse (GFR)	1982

Gestures (cassette)					Black Sheep Recording Co1982

The Real World					    Purple Heather Press	1986

Out of the Past: Selected Poems 1961-1986 Rivelin Grapheme	1987

Poems for Tribune					Wide Skirt Press		1988

The Gift						    Redbeck Press		    1989

Confessions of an Old believer		Redbeck Press		    1996

Beware of Men in Suits				Incline Press			1996

As Good A Reason As Any			    Redbeck Press		    1999

The Five Senses					    Incline Press			1999

Take it Easy						Redbeck Press		    2003

Bopper						        Ragged Edge		        2004

Germany and all that Jazz			Ragged Edge		        2005

Short Statements					Redbeck Press		    2006

Laying Something Down				Shoestring Press		2007

Cool Kerouac					    Beat Scene Press		2008

What I Said						    Eyelet Books			2008

Streetsinger						Shoestring Press		2010

References

1936 births
British poets
Writers from Preston, Lancashire
Living people
British male poets
Military personnel from Preston, Lancashire
20th-century British Army personnel
British Army soldiers